The 1915 Norwich by-election was held on 6 February 1915.  The by-election was held due to the incumbent Liberal MP, Sir Frederick Low, being appointed as a Judge of the King's Bench division of the High Court.  It was won by the Liberal candidate Hilton Young, who was elected unopposed.

References

Elections in Norwich
By-elections to the Parliament of the United Kingdom in Norfolk constituencies
Unopposed by-elections to the Parliament of the United Kingdom (need citation)
1915 elections in the United Kingdom
1915 in England
20th century in Norfolk